Brookfield Place is a skyscraper located in downtown Calgary, Alberta, Canada. The complex is home to Brookfield Place East, a 56-storey  office tower, which upon its completion in 2017, became the tallest building in Calgary, exceeding The Bow. 

The commercial complex between 1st and 2nd Streets and 6th and 7th Avenues SW in downtown Calgary, was originally imagined as a full-block development with a 56-storey East and 41-storey West office tower, the project has since been scaled back with groundbreaking indefinitely delayed for the West tower.

Construction
The Brookfield Place complex was designed by London and Toronto-based architecture firm Arney Fender Katsalidis. The delivery architect was Calgary based Dialog. The original name for the site was "225 Sixth", which was later changed to Brookfield Place. The design would feature a three-storey, 50,000 square foot transparent glass pavilion connected to the City's Plus 15 pedway system, a winter garden, and numerous sustainable design features such as storm-water management and auto sharing, car pooling and electric plug-in parking facilities.

Groundbreaking for the complex took place on October 29, 2013, which was attended by Calgary Mayor Naheed Nenshi. On May 11, 2016, Brookfield Place East reached 247 metres, exceeding The Bow and becoming the tallest building in Calgary.

The development is constructed to LEED Gold standard for Core and Shell. Commuters have direct access to the Plus 15 skywalk system and the CTrain LRT system on 7th Avenue.

Glass window failures
In October 2017 Brookfield Place East experienced two separate window failures, the first occurring on October 15 when high wind caused window-washing equipment to strike the northeast facade causing a panel from the 51st floor to break. The second incident on October 29 saw a panel from the 23rd floor break, causing shards of glass to fall on the street below.

Tenants
Following the announcement of the Brookfield Place complex, Canadian oil and gas company Cenovus announced an agreement to be the anchor tenant for the new Brookfield Place East in July 2013.

See also
List of tallest buildings in Calgary

References

External links

Brookfield Place official website

Skyscraper office buildings in Canada
Skyscrapers in Calgary
Brookfield Properties buildings
Office buildings completed in 2017